Book of Secrets is the second album by British metal band Balance of Power. It was released in 1998. Book of Secrets is the first album of the band to feature Lance King on vocals.

Concept 

The album is a thematic album, inspired by The Bible Code, written by Michael Drosnin.

Production and recording 

Book of Secrets was produced and engineered by drummer Lionel Hicks. Recording took place at POD Studios in London, England. It was also mixed by new lead vocalist Lance King, as well as Hicks, at Logic Studios in Minneapolis.

Original track listing 
"Desert of Lost Souls" – 0:53
"Walking on Top of the World" – 7:03
"Book of Secrets" – 7:42
"When Heaven Calls Your Name" – 6:20
"It's Not Over (Until It's Over)" – 5:01
"Do You Dream of Angels" – 5:46
"Seven Days into Nevermore" – 6:49
"Miracles and Dreams" – 8:01
"Stranger Days (To Come)" – 5:40

Personnel

Band members 
Lance King – lead vocals
Pete Southern – guitar
Bill Yates – guitar
Ivan Gunn – keyboards
Chris Dale – bass
Lionel Hicks – drums

Additional contributions 
Tony Ritchie – vocals
Tony O'Hara – vocals
Rob Brown – narrator

Production and engineering 
Lionel Hicks – producer, engineer, mixer
Lance King – mixer
Crusoe – art design

References

External links 
Book of Secrets on Amazon
Book of Secrets on AllMusic

1998 albums
Balance of Power (band) albums